The Casa di Riposo per Musicisti (literally 'rest home for musicians') is a home for retired opera singers and musicians in Milan, northern Italy, founded by the Italian composer Giuseppe Verdi (whose statue is outside the building) in 1896. The building was designed in the neo-Gothic style by Italian architect, Camillo Boito. Both Verdi and his wife, Giuseppina Strepponi are buried there. A documentary film about life in the Casa di Riposo, Il Bacio di Tosca (Tosca's Kiss in the US), was made in 1984 by the Swiss director Daniel Schmid.

History

In the last years of his life, Verdi wrote to his friend Giulio Monteverde:
Of all my works, that which pleases me the most is the Casa that I had built in Milan to shelter elderly singers who have not been favoured by fortune, or who when they were young did not have the virtue of saving their money. Poor and dear companions of my life!" 

In 1888, Verdi had already built, equipped and managed a hospital in Villanova sull'Arda, a town bordering the fields of his estate. The following year, he turned to his next philanthropic project, a home for retired opera singers and musicians who had fallen on hard times. In 1889, he wrote to Giulio Ricordi that he had acquired a large piece of empty land in Milan outside the Porta Garibaldi on which he planned to build his Casa di Riposo. He then announced his plans publicly in an 1891 interview in the Gazetta musicale di Milano. Construction did not begin until 1896, but in the intervening years Verdi and wife, Giuseppina Strepponi, met frequently with the architect, Camillo Boito to plan the project. (Camillo Boito was the brother of Verdi's friend and librettist, Arrigo Boito.) He also sought out information on how other hospices for the elderly were run. In 1895, Verdi made provisions in his will to fund the Casa after his death, bequeathing the future royalties from his operas to the Casa di Riposo per Musicisti - Fondazione Giuseppe Verdi. Construction was completed in 1899, but Verdi did not want any residents to move in until after his death.

Notable residents

Gemma Bosini
Carlo Broccardi
Giuseppe Costa
 Gilda Dalla Rizza
Sara Scuderi
Mariano Stabile

References

Sources
Biggi, Maria Ida, "Camillo Boito", in Marrone, Gaetana (ed.), Encyclopedia of Italian Literary Studies, Volume 1, CRC Press, 2007. 
Cella, Franca and Daolmi, Davide (eds.), La sensibilità sociale di Giuseppe e Giuseppina Verdi: dalle società di mutuo soccorso alla tutela dei musicisti d'oggi, EDT srl, 2002. 
Conati, Marcello, Verdi: Interviste e incontri, EDT srl, 2000. 
Cretella, Chiara, Introduction to Boito, Camillo, Storielle vane, Edizioni Pendragon, 2007. 
Goodman, Walter, Review: Il Bacio di Tosca (1984), The New York Times, 24 July 1985
Lubrani, Mauro, Verdi a Montecatini, Polistampa, 2001
Phillips-Matz, Mary Jane, "Verdi's life, a thematic biography" in Balthazar, Scott Leslie (ed.), The Cambridge Companion to Verdi, Cambridge University Press, 2004, pp. 3–14. 
Randel, Don Michael (ed.), "Verdi, Giuseppe", The Harvard Biographical Dictionary of Music, Harvard University Press, 1996, pp. 944–946. 
Verdi, Giuseppe and Boito, Arrigo, The Verdi-Boito correspondence (edited by Marcello Conati, Mario Medici and William Weaver, English translation by William Weaver), University of Chicago Press, 1994. 
Savorra, Massimiliano, Boito e la Casa per musicisti: un testamento in pietra per lo stile nazionale, Zucconi, Guido-Serena, Tiziana (a cura di), Camillo Boito. Un protagonista dell’Ottocento italiano, Istituto Veneto di Scienze, Lettere ed Arti, Venezia 2002, pp. 167–191.

External links
Official website

Gothic Revival architecture in Italy
Palaces in Milan
Giuseppe Verdi
1896 establishments in Italy
Tourist attractions in Milan